The Dongfeng Fengguang 330 is a compact MPV produced by Chinese auto maker Dongfeng Sokon (DFSK), a subsidiary of Dongfeng Motor Co., Ltd.

Overview

The Fengguang 330 debuted in 2014, and was launched in the Chinese auto market in 2015. The Dongfeng Fengguang 330 compact MPV seats seven in a 2-3-2 configuration with prices starting from 32,900 yuan to 44,900 yuan.

A crossover version featuring plastic black cladding body lower trim parts called the Fengguang 360 was also available in the Chinese market for the 2015 model year with prices ranging from 57,900 yuan to 74,900 yuan.

The Fengguang 360 model is available with two four-cylinder power plants. The engine options are a 1.3 liter engine with 78 hp and a 1.5 liter engine with 116 hp, both engines are mated to a 5-speed manual transmission.

The Fengguang 330 later spawned an upgraded and restyled model called the Dongfeng Fengguang 330S in 2017, sharing the main body panels while featuring redesigned front and rear DRGs.

References

External links

Fengguang 330 website

Compact MPVs
Cars introduced in 2017
Rear-wheel-drive vehicles
2010s cars
Minivans
Cars of China